Jack Streader (13 May 1927 – 2 February 1994) was  a former Australian rules footballer who played with Fitzroy in the Victorian Football League (VFL).

Notes

External links 		
		
		

		
		
1927 births		
1994 deaths		
Australian rules footballers from Victoria (Australia)		
Fitzroy Football Club players